Geometry is an album by Brazilian jazz saxophonist Ivo Perelman featuring American pianist Borah Bergman, which was recorded in 1996 and released on the English Leo label.

Reception

In his review for AllMusic, Alex Henderson says that "this CD doesn't quite fall into the 'essential' category... Nonetheless, Geometry is an enjoyable release that Perelman's more-devoted followers will want."

The Penguin Guide to Jazz notes that "Bergman is wily enough to find ways of both supporting and undercutting the mighty sound of the tenor."

Track listing
All compositions by Ivo Perelman
 "Geometry" - 11:02
 "Linear Pasion" - 4:46
 "Parallelism"  - 9:30
 "Cavaquinho take 1" - 2:56
 "Cubic Rotation" - 11:23
 "Equal Angels" - 4:22
 "Sonic Conic" - 2:57
 "Subspaces"  - 6:41
 "Cavaquinho take 2" - 3:26

Personnel
Ivo Perelman - tenor sax
Borah Bergman - piano

References

1997 albums
Ivo Perelman albums
Leo Records albums